The 2012 Chang-Sat Bangkok Open was a professional tennis tournament played on hard courts. It was the fourth edition of the tournament which was part of the 2012 ATP Challenger Tour. It took place in Bangkok, Thailand between 27 August and 2 September 2012.

Singles main-draw entrants

Seeds

 1 Rankings are as of August 20, 2012.

Other entrants
The following players received wildcards into the singles main draw:
  Kong Pop Lertchai
  Peerakiat Siriluethaiwattana
  Warit Sornbutnark
  Kittipong Wachiramanowong

The following players received entry from the qualifying draw:
  Jeong Suk-young
  Christopher Rungkat
  Harel Srugo
  Kento Takeuchi

Champions

Singles

 Dudi Sela def.  Yūichi Sugita, 6–1, 7–5

Doubles

 Divij Sharan /  Vishnu Vardhan def.  Lee Hsin-han /  Peng Hsien-yin, 6–3, 6–4

External links
Official Website

 
 ATP Challenger Tour
Tennis, ATP Challenger Tour, Chang-Sat Bangkok Open
Tennis, ATP Challenger Tour, Chang-Sat Bangkok Open

Tennis, ATP Challenger Tour, Chang-Sat Bangkok Open
Tennis, ATP Challenger Tour, Chang-Sat Bangkok Open